This list of Princeton University people include notable alumni (graduates and attendees) or faculty members (professors of various ranks, researchers, and visiting lecturers or professors) affiliated with Princeton University. People who have given public lectures, talks or non-curricular seminars; studied as non-degree students; received honorary degrees; or served as administrative staff at the university are excluded from the list. Summer school attendees and visitors are generally excluded from the list, since summer terms are not part of formal academic years.

Individuals are sorted by category and alphabetized within each category. The "Affiliation" fields in the tables in this list indicate the person's affiliation with Princeton and use the following notation:

 B indicates a bachelor's degree
 Att indicates that the person attended the undergraduate program but may not have graduated
 AM indicates a Master of Arts degree
 MPP indicates a Master of Public Policy degree awarded by the Princeton School of Public and International Affairs
 MPA indicates a Master in Public Affairs degree awarded by the Princeton School of Public and International Affairs
 MCF indicates completion of the Mid-Career Fellowship, a discontinued non-degree program of the Woodrow Wilson School
 MSE indicates a Master of Science in Engineering degree awarded by the School of Engineering and Applied Science
 PhD indicates a Ph.D. degree
 GS indicates that the person was a graduate student but may not have received a degree
 F indicates a faculty member, followed by years denoting the time of service on the faculty
 T indicates a Trustee of Princeton University, followed by years denoting the time of service
 Pres indicates a President of Princeton University, followed by years denoting the time of service

Politics and government

Royalty
Kyril, Prince of Preslav
Prince Ali bin Hussein of the Hashemite Kingdom of Jordan
Prince Ghazi bin Muhammad
Prince Moulay Hicham of Morocco
Queen Noor of Jordan
Prince Turki bin Faisal Al Saud

Military
James Millikin Bevans – U.S. Air Force Major General
Alexander Bonnyman Jr., 1932 – World War II Medal of Honor recipient killed in the Battle of Tarawa
William L. Brandon, 1819 – Confederate Army general
James Caldwell, A.B. 1759 – American Revolutionary soldier and chaplain
James Robb Church, 1888 – Medal of Honor recipient, Spanish–American War
Kenneth F. Cramer, B.Litt. 1916, M.A. 1917 – United States Army Major General and Chief of the National Guard Bureau
William J. Crowe (1925–2007), Ph.D. 1965 – U.S. Navy Admiral, Chairman of Joint Chiefs of Staff and American Ambassador to Great Britain
Philip Dalton (1903–1941) M.S. 1925 – American Naval aviator and engineer, creator of E6B analog flight computer
Glen Edwards, M.S. 1947 – U.S. Air Force test pilot
Joseph C. Fegan Jr., B.A. 1943 – United States Marine Corps Lieutenant general; World War II, Korea and Vietnam
Andrew Goodpaster, A.M. 1949, M.S.E. 1949, Ph.D. 1950 – Supreme Allied Commander, Europe for NATO
Henry "Lighthorse Harry" Lee, A.B. 1773 – American Revolutionary cavalry officer, father of Robert E. Lee
Gordon Johnston, A.B. 1896 – Medal of Honor recipient, Philippine–American War
Mark A. Milley, A.B. 1980 – U.S. Army General, 20th Chairman of the Joint Chiefs of Staff
David Petraeus, M.P.A. 1985 Ph.D. 1987 – former commander of International Security Assistance Force (ISAF) and United States Forces Afghanistan (USFOR-A), USCENTCOM, and Multi-National Force – Iraq; former Director of the Central Intelligence Agency
Nathaniel Scudder – physician and patriot leader during the Revolutionary War
Elliott White Springs, A.B. 1917 – World War I flying ace and memoirist
Tamon Yamaguchi, 1921–1923 – Japanese Admiral
Christopher G. Cavoli, A.B. 1987 – commander, United States European Command
Blake Wayne Van Leer, M.S. 1959 – commander and captain in the U.S. Navy. Lead SeaBee program and lead the nuclear research and power unit at McMurdo Station during Operation Deep Freeze.

Academia
This section includes lists of notable academics who graduated from Princeton and notable Princeton faculty members.

Alumni and students

 Nicholas Allard (born 1952), dean and president of Brooklyn Law School
 E. Spencer Miller (1836), dean of the University of Pennsylvania Law School
Mark Steiner (1942–2020), professor of philosophy of mathematics and physics at the Hebrew University of Jerusalem

Faculty and staff
Albert Einstein was one of many scholars at the independent Institute for Advanced Study not formally associated with the university but nevertheless closely linked to it.

Architecture
Stan Allen – former dean of the Princeton University School of Architecture; author of Points and Lines
Elizabeth Diller – architect, professor of architecture, winner of MacArthur Foundation Fellowship 1999–2004
Michael Graves – professor emeritus
Vincent Lee – architect, writer, mountaineer, and member of the Institute of Andean Studies
Paul Lewis – professor; associate dean; principal of LTL Architects
Sergey Padyukov – architect, engineer and human rights activist
Monica Ponce de Leon – dean of the School of Architecture; Winner National Design Award 
Kazuyo Sejima – principal of Tokyo-based architecture firm SANAA
Sarah Whiting – assistant professor and M.Arch thesis director; editor of Assemblage and Log; principal of WW Architecture

Economics and business
Orley Ashenfelter – professor of economics, winner of the Frisch Medal (1982)
Ben Bernanke – professor of economics and public affairs; Chairman of the Federal Reserve Board
William G. Bowen – professor emeritus of economics; president of Princeton University, 1972–1988; president of The Andrew W. Mellon Foundation, 1988–2006
Angus Deaton – professor of economics; president of the American Economic Association; Nobel Prize in economics (2015)
Avinash Dixit – professor of economics; co-author of Games of Strategy; former president of the Econometric Society; 2008 president of the American Economic Association
Gene Grossman – professor of economics
Daniel Kahneman – professor of economics and psychology, Nobel Prize in economics (2002)
Nobuhiro Kiyotaki – professor of economics; winner of the 1997 Nakahara Prize of the Japan Economics Association and the 1999 Yrjö Jahnsson Award of the European Economic Association
Alan Krueger – professor of economics
Paul Krugman – professor of economics, New York Times columnist, winner of the John Bates Clark Medal, Nobel Prize in economics (2008)
Arthur Lewis – former professor; Nobel laureate (Economics 1979)
Burton Malkiel Ph.D. [1964] – professor of economics; former dean of the Yale School of Management; author of A Random Walk Down Wall Street
Eric Maskin – professor of economics; Nobel Prize in economics (2007)
Albert Rees – former Provost, professor of economics and advisor to President Gerald Ford
Harvey S. Rosen – professor of economics, former chairman of Council of Economic Advisers
Harold Tafler Shapiro – professor emeritus of economics, former president of Princeton University and of the University of Michigan
Christopher Sims – professor of economics; Nobel Prize in economics (2011)
Lars E. O. Svensson – professor of economics; deputy governor of the central bank of Sweden; one of the ten best economists in the world according to IDEAS/RePEc

Government, law, and public policy
Bruce Alger – former U.S. Representative for Texas's 5th congressional district, based in Dallas 
Charles Beitz – professor of politics
Jeremy Ben-Ami – executive director of J Street and JStreetPac
Cyril Edwin Black – professor of history and international affairs 1939–1986, director of the Center of International Studies 1968–1985
Willie Blount – Governor of Tennessee from 1809 to 1815
Barbara Bodine – diplomat in residence
Ken Buck – representative, Eastern Colorado, U.S. House of Representatives
Thomas J. Christensen – William P. Boswell Professor of World Politics of Peace
John E. Colhoun –  U.S. Senator and lawyer from South Carolina
Ted Cruz – U.S. Senator for Texas, 2013–present; candidate for the 2016 Republican presidential nomination
Angus Deaton – Dwight D. Eisenhower Professor of International Affairs, and professor of economics and international affairs, Woodrow Wilson School and department of economics
Alexandra Davis DiPentima, chief judge of the Connecticut Appellate Court
Robert Ehrlich – governor, Maryland, 2003-2007
Richard Falk – Albert G. Milbank Professor of International Law and Practice, Emeritus
Aaron Friedberg – professor of international relations
Edgar S. Furniss Jr. – professor of political science
Robert P. George – professor of jurisprudence, constitutional law scholar
Robert Gilpin – Eisenhower Professor of Public and International Affairs, Emeritus
Bob Giuffra – partner, Sullivan & Cromwell
Jan Gross – professor of history
Thad Hutcheson (Class of 1937) – lawyer and Republican politician from Houston, Texas
Robert Hutchings – diplomat-in-residence
G. John Ikenberry – Albert G. Milbank Professor of Politics and International Affairs
Harold James – professor of History and International Affairs
Elena Kagan, associate justice, U.S. Supreme Court
Thomas Kean 48th governor of New Jersey and chairman of 9/11 Commission 
Nannerl O. Keohane – Laurance S. Rockefeller Distinguished Visiting Professor of Public Affairs
Robert Keohane – university professor of international relations
George Kern, 1947 – lawyer, partner at Sullivan & Cromwell
Daniel Kurtzer – diplomat-in-residence
Ira Brad Matetsky, A.B. 1984 – business litigation and real estate lawyer and prominent Wikipedian
Nolan McCarty – Susan Dod Brown Professor of Politics and Public Affairs
Helen Milner – B.C. Forbes Professor of Politics and International Affairs
Hassan Ali Mire – first Minister of Education of the Somali Democratic Republic
Robert Morrow (Class of 1987) – former Republican county chairman in Travis County, Texas
Philip Pettit – professor of politics and philosophy
Jay Powell – 16th chair of the Federal Reserve
Uwe Reinhardt – James Madison professor of political economy
Paul Sarbanes – former US Senator from Maryland
Stephen Schulhofer (born 1942) – professor of law at the University of Pennsylvania Law School and NYU Law School
Reed Shuldiner – Alvin L. Snowiss Professor of Law at the University of Pennsylvania Law School
Anne-Marie Slaughter – dean of the Woodrow Wilson School of Public and International Affairs
John Thomas Steen Jr. – lawyer in San Antonio and currently the 108th Secretary of State of Texas
Isaac Tichenor, 1775 – Governor of Vermont, U.S. Senator
Robert C. Tucker – IBM Professor of International Studies, Emeritus
John Waterbury – William Stewart Tod Professor of Politics and International Affairs, Emeritus
Joel Westheimer - professor of citizenship education at the University of Ottawa
Thomas Woodrow Wilson, A.B. 1879 – author of Congressional Government 1885; president of Princeton University, 1902–10; Governor of New Jersey, 1911–13; 28th president of the US, 1913–21; recipient of the Nobel Peace Prize, 1919, for promoting the establishment of the League of Nations
Sheldon Wolin – professor of politics

Art, literature, and humanities
Kwame Anthony Appiah – professor of philosophy
Edward J. Balleisen (BA 1987) – professor of history at Duke University
Peter Brown – professor of history
Anthony Burgess – visiting professor, 1970–71; novelist and critic; author of The Long Day Wanes, A Clockwork Orange and Earthly Powers
Américo Castro – professor of Hispanic literature
Lisa R. Cohen – Ferris professor of journalism; Emmy Award-winning TV news magazine producer, author
Robert Darnton – emeritus professor of history
Donald Davidson – professor of philosophy
Jeff Dolven, professor of English at Princeton University. 
Selden Edwards – best-selling novelist, headmaster, teacher
Jeffrey Eugenides – novelist, professor of creative writing and Pulitzer Prize Winner
Robert Fagles – emeritus professor of English and comparative literature
Denis Feeney – professor of classics
John V. Fleming – emeritus professor of English and comparative literature
Hal Foster – art critic professor in the department of art and archeology
Arthur Frothingham – professor of Art and Archaeology
Emmet Gowin – professor of photography
Anthony Grafton – professor of history
Gilbert Harman – professor of philosophy, winner of the Jean Nicod Prize
William Howarth – professor of English and environmental studies
Frank Cameron Jackson – professor of philosophy
Walter Kaufmann – professor of philosophy
Yusef Komunyakaa – poet, professor in the Creative Writing Program (Pulitzer Prize for Poetry)
Saul Kripke – professor emeritus of Philosophy at Princeton University; winner of the 2001 Schock Prize in Logic and Philosophy
Mirjam Kuenkler – assistant professor of Near Eastern Studies
Victor Lange – professor of modern languages
Paul Lansky – composer, professor of music
Chang-Rae Lee – professor of writing, New York Times bestselling author
David K. Lewis – professor of philosophy
Perry Link – professor of East Asian Studies
Toni Morrison – professor in the Creative Writing Program, Nobel laureate (Literature 1993)
Paul Muldoon – professor of poetry, Pulitzer Prize winner
Haruki Murakami – visiting professor, literature, creative writing
Alexander Nehamas – professor of philosophy
Philip Nord – professor of history
Joyce Carol Oates – Roger S. Berlind Distinguished Professor of the Humanities; professor in the Creative Writing Program; author; Pulitzer Prize nominee
Elaine Pagels – professor of religion
Francis Landey Patton – professor of theology; president of the university, 1888–1902
Ricardo Piglia – professor of Latin-American literature
Thomas J. Preston Jr. – professor of archeology
Albert J. Raboteau – Henry W. Putnam Professor of Religion, Princeton University, former dean of the graduate school
Noliwe Rooks - associate director of the African-American program at Princeton University, author
Richard Rorty – professor of philosophy
Carl Emil Schorske – emeritus professor of history, winner of the 1981 Pulitzer Prize for General Non-Fiction for his book Fin-de-Siècle Vienna: Politics and Culture (1980)
Ruth Simmons – vice provost, 1992–95 – first female and first black president of any Ivy League school (Brown)
Peter Singer – professor of human values, expert on practical ethics
P. Adams Sitney – film historian, professor of visual arts
Michael A. Smith – professor of philosophy
Nigel Smith – professor of English
 Walter Terence Stace – professor of philosophy
Donald Steven – Canadian composer, winner of the JUNO Award for Best Classical Composition and the Jules-Léger Prize
Gregory Vlastos – professor of philosophy
Andrew Fleming West – Giger Professor of Latin, 1883–1928; dean of the graduate school, 1900–1928
Cornel West – professor of religion and Africa American studies
C. K. Williams – professor of poetry, Pulitzer Prize winner
Michael Wood – professor in the English department

Math and science
Forman S. Acton – professor of computer science
Philip Warren Anderson – Joseph Henry Professor of Physics and recipient of the Nobel Prize in Physics
 Manjul Bhargava – Brandon Fradd, Class of 1983, professor of mathematics, 2014 Fields Medalist
John H. Conway – professor of mathematics, best known for the Game of Life
Ingrid Daubechies – professor of mathematics; namesake of Daubechies wavelet
Henry Eyring – professor of chemistry, known for the Eyring equation; recipient of the National Medal of Science in 1966
Charles Fefferman – professor of mathematics, Fields Medalist
Val Fitch – professor emeritus of physics, Nobel laureate
J. Richard Gott – professor of astrophysics, winner of the President's Award for Distinguished Teaching
James E. Gunn – Eugene Higgins Professor of Astronomy, leader of the Sloan Digital Sky Survey and predicted the eponymous Gunn–Peterson trough
Joseph Henry – professor of natural philosophy
Thomas H. Jordan – former professor of earth sciences; current director of the Southern California Earthquake Center
Mustapha Ishak Boushaki – professor of physics
Karl Jöreskog – professor of statistics
Celeste Rohlfing –  Deputy Assistant Director at the National Science Foundation and Chief Operating Officer at the American Association for the Advancement of Science
Daniel Kahneman – Eugene Higgins Professor of Psychology, winner of the 2002 Nobel Prize in Economics
Nicholas Katz – professor of mathematics
Brian Kernighan – co-author of AWK and AMPL, author of The C Programming Language
Elon Lindenstrauss – professor of mathematics, Fields Medalist
Juan Martin Maldacena – professor emeritus of physics, 2012 Fundamental Physics Prize
Fernando Codá Marques – professor of mathematics
George A. Miller – professor emeritus of psychology, seminal contributions in cognitive psychology and cognitive science
Gananath Obeyesekere – professor of anthropology
Andrei Okounkov – professor of mathematics, Fields Medalist
Gerard K. O'Neill – professor of physics, leader in field of space colonization, author of The High Frontier: Human Colonies in Space
Jeremiah Ostriker – professor of astrophysics and recipient of the National Medal of Science
Philip James Edwin Peebles – professor emeritus of physics, one of the first to predict the nature of the cosmic microwave background radiation
Peter Sarnak – professor of mathematics
Nathan Seiberg – professor emeritus of physics, 2012 Fundamental Physics Prize
Paul Seymour – professor of mathematics
Yigong Shi – professor of molecular biology, leader in the field of apoptosis
Osamu Shimomura – researcher honored with the 2008 Nobel Prize in Chemistry for his work on GFP
Goro Shimura – professor emeritus of mathematics, fundamental contributions to number theory and automorphic forms, especially in Langlands program
Yakov G. Sinai – professor of mathematics
David Spergel – professor of astrophysics, leading astrophysicist
Elias M. Stein – professor of mathematics, recipient of the Steele Prize (1984 and 2002), the Schock Prize in Mathematics (1993), the Wolf Prize in Mathematics (1999), the National Medal of Science (2002), and Stefan Bergman Prize (2005)
Paul Steinhardt – Albert Einstein professor of physics; recipient of the Dirac Medal (2002)
 Robert Tarjan – professor of computer science, inventor of many algorithms related to graph theory, winner of the 1986 Turing Award, recipient of the 1982 Nevanlinna Prize
Joseph Hooton Taylor – professor of physics, 1993 Nobel Prize in Physics
Daniel C. Tsui – professor of applied physics and electrical engineering, 1998 Nobel Prize in Physics
John Archibald Wheeler – professor emeritus of physics, later collaborator of Albert Einstein, advisor to Richard Feynman and Kip Thorne
Eric Wieschaus – professor of molecular biology, Nobel Prize in Physiology or Medicine
Andrew Wiles – professor of mathematics, proved Fermat's Last Theorem, winner of the Schock Prize (1995), Royal Medal (1996), Cole Prize (1996), Wolf Prize (1996), King Faisal Prize (1998) and Shaw Prize (2005)
Edward Witten – professor emeritus of physics, Fields Medalist, 2012 Fundamental Physics Prize
Andrew Yao – computer scientist, winner of the 2000 Turing award

Engineering
 Amir Ali Ahmadi – professor of operations research and financial engineering
 Robert Calderbank – professor of electrical engineering, mathematics, and applied mathematics
 Erhan Çınlar – professor of operations research and financial engineering
 Ahmed Cemal Eringen – professor of mechanical and aerospace engineering, leading expert in elasticity theory, continuum mechanics, and plasticity
 Jianqing Fan – professor of operations research and financial engineering
 Jason W. Fleischer – associate professor of electrical engineering 
 Claire F. Gmachl – professor of electrical engineering
 Brian Kernighan – professor of computer science and co-author of The C Programming Language
  William A. Massey – professor of operations research and financial engineering
 Robert Sedgewick – professor of computer science
 Alexander Smits – professor of mechanical and aerospace engineering, leading expert on turbulence and fluid dynamics
 Howard Stone – professor of mechanical and aerospace engineering and chemical engineering, leading expert in fluid dynamics
 Robert J. Vanderbei – professor of operations research and financial engineering, mathematics, astrophysics, computer science

Business
Gerhard Andlinger, A.B. 1952 – founder of Andlinger & Company
James T. Aubrey, A.B. 1941 – president of CBS and MGM
Norman Augustine, B.S.E. 1957– former CEO of Lockheed Martin
Ben Baldanza, M.P.A./U.R.P. 1986 – former CEO of Spirit Airlines
Alexander Bannwart, L.L.B 1906
Jeff Bezos, B.S.E. 1986 – founder of Amazon.com
Frank Biondi, A.B. 1966 – former chairman of Viacom
John C. Bogle, A.B. 1951 – former founder and CEO of The Vanguard Group, which pioneered the index fund
Charles W. Coker, A.B. 1955 – former CEO and chairman of Sonoco Products
Archibald Crossley, B. 1950 – pollster and pioneer in the field of public opinion research
Franklin D'Olier, A.B. 1898 – former president and chairman of Prudential Insurance Company; first National Commander of the American Legion (1919–20)
Steve Feinberg, A.B. 1982 – billionaire financier and a top economic adviser to President Donald Trump 
David Siegel (computer scientist), B.S.E. 1983 – co-founder and co-chairman of Two Sigma
George M. Ferris, Jr. – investment banker and philanthropist 
Joseph Fichera, B. 1976 – founder and CEO of Saber Partners; auction rate securities expert
Harvey S. Firestone, Jr., class of 1920 – former CEO of Firestone Tire and Rubber Company
Malcolm Forbes, A.B. 1941 – businessman and publisher
Steve Forbes, A.B. 1970 – son of Malcolm Forbes; businessman and publisher of Forbes magazine
William Clay Ford, Jr., 1979 – executive chairman of the board of directors Ford Motor Company
Thomas F. Frist, III, 1991 – investor
William Fung, B.S.E. 1970 – managing director of Li & Fung (Trading) Ltd.
Franklin Potts Glass, Jr., 1877 – newspaper publisher
Phil Goldman, B.S.E. 1986 – founder of WebTV
Bob Hugin, A.B. 1976- former chairman of Celgene, and Republican nominee for New Jersey 2018 senate race.
Jaquelin H. Hume, B. 1928 – founder of Basic American Foods, conservative philanthropist
Nathan Hubbard, B.A. - business and music executive, former CEO of Ticketmaster
Carl Icahn, A.B. 1957 – corporate raider
Andrea Jung, A.B. 1979 – CEO of Avon Products
John Katzman, A.B. Architecture 1981 – founder of The Princeton Review
F. Thomson Leighton, B.S.E. 1978 – cofounder of Akamai Technologies
Arthur D. Levinson, Ph.D. 1977 – chairman of Apple Inc. (2011–present); chairman of Genentech (1999–2014), CEO Calico
Peter B. Lewis, A.B. 1955 – chairman of Progressive
Joseph Wharton Lippincott, Jr. – head of Philadelphia publisher J. B. Lippincott & Co.
Donold Lourie, A.B. 1922 – president and CEO of Quaker Oats Company
Aaron Marcus, B.A. 1965 – founded Aaron Marcus and Associates, Inc. in 1982
Ginna Marston, B.A. 1980 – public service advertising
James S. McDonnell, M.S. 1921 – founded McDonnell Aircraft Corporation in 1939
Nick Morgan, A.B. English literature 1976 – speaking coach and author
Robert S. Murley, B.A. 1972 – chairman of the Investment Banking of Credit Suisse Securities and chairman of the Educational Testing Service (ETS).
Ellen Pao – CEO of Reddit
Sandi Peterson, M.P.A. – worldwide chairman, Johnson & Johnson
Louis Rukeyser, A.B. 1954 – former host of Wall $treet Week and business commentator
Eric Schmidt, B.S.E. 1976 – former CEO of Google; 136th wealthiest person in the world in 2011
Jeffery A. Smisek, A.B. Economics 1976 – CEO of United Continental Holdings
Tad Smith – CEO, Sotheby's
Jon Steinberg, B.A. 1999 – president and COO of BuzzFeed
Rawleigh Warner, Jr., A.B. – former president, CEO and chairman of Mobil
John Weinberg, A.B. 1948 – head of Goldman Sachs from 1976 to 1990
Meg Whitman, A.B. 1977 – CEO of eBay and Hewlett-Packard
Sir Gordon Wu, B.S.E. Civil Engineering 1958 – founder and chairman of Hopewell Holdings Ltd

Science and technology
Here are listed alumni who made notable contributions to science and technology outside academia.

Astronauts
James C. Adamson, M.S.E. 1977
Daniel T. Barry, M.A. 1977, M.S.E. 1977, Ph.D. 1980
Brian Binnie, M.S.E. 1978
Pete Conrad, Jr., B.S.E. 1953, M.A. 1966, only Princeton graduate to walk on the Moon.
Gerald Carr, M.S.E. 1962
Gregory T. Linteris, B.S.E. 1979, Ph.D. 1990

Biology
Gerhard Fankhauser (1901–1981) embryologist, professor from 1931 to 1969.
Donna M. Fernandes M.Sc. 1984, Ph.D. 1988, president and CEO Buffalo Zoo 2000 – 2017.

Engineering and other natural sciences
Hal Abelson, A.B. 1969 – directed implementation of the Logo programming language for the Apple II; professor of electrical engineering and computer science at MIT
Yitzhak Apeloig (born 1944) – Israeli computational chemistry professor and president of the Technion
Daniel Barringer, A.B. 1879 – geologist
David R. Boggs, B.S.E. 1972 – co-inventor (with Robert Metcalfe) of Ethernet
Eugene Lent Church, PhD, A.B. 1946 - nuclear and theoretical physicist and father of the Church-Weneser Effect
Henry Crew, A.B. 1882 – physicist; president of the American Physical Society in 1909
Thomas C. Hanks, 1966 – seismologist, introduced Moment magnitude scale to measure earthquakes
John D. Hunter, 1990 – neurobiology
Ernest Lester Jones, A.B. 1898 – head of the United States Coast and Geodetic Survey from 1914 until his death in 1929
Susan Landau, A.B. 1976 – mathematician and cybersecurity policy expert
Yueh-Lin Loo, Ph.D. 2001 – chemical engineer
William C. Martin, Ph.D. 1956 – atomic spectroscopist
Andreas Mandelis, Ph.D. 1980 – expert on photonics
Wilder Penfield, 1913 – Canadian neurosurgeon
John Warner, Ph.D. 1988 – chemist, one of the founders of the field of green chemistry

Literature

Pulitzer Prize winners
A. Scott Berg, A.B. 1971 – Pulitzer Prize winner for biography of Charles Lindbergh, winner of the National Book Award for biography of Max Perkins
Robert Caro, A.B.  1957 – two-time Pulitzer Prize Winner for The Power Broker and Master of the Senate
George F. Kennan, A.B. 1925 – two-time Pulitzer Prize winner for history in 1957 and biography in 1968; Cold War diplomat; architect of "containment" strategy (also listed in Government: Other)
Galway Kinnell, A.B. 1948 – Pulitzer Prize and National Book Award-winning poet
Arthur Krock, A.B. 1908 – two-time Pulitzer Prize winner while writing for The New York Times in the 1930s
John Matteson, A.B. 1983 – Pulitzer Prize winner for Biography in 2008 for Eden's Outcasts: The Story of Louisa May Alcott and Her FatherCharles McIlwain, A.B.1894 –  Pulitzer Prize for history in 1924; professor at Princeton
John McPhee, A.B. 1953 – Humanities Council professor, 1999 Pulitzer Prize recipient
James M. McPherson – Professor of History; Pulitzer Prize winner in 1989 for Battle Cry of FreedomW. S. Merwin, A.B. 1948 – Pulitzer Prize-winning poet and translator
Steven Naifeh, A.B. 1974 – Pulitzer Prize for biography or autobiography in 1991 for Jackson Pollock: An American SagaEugene O'Neill, class of 1910 (did not graduate) – Nobel laureate (Literature 1936), three-time Pulitzer Prize winner
Ralph Barton Perry, A.B. 1896 – Pulitzer Prize for biography in 1936, professor at Harvard University
Ernest Poole, A.B. 1902 –  Pulitzer Prize for fiction in 1918
David Remnick, A.B. 1981 – Pulitzer Prize Winner for general non-fiction in 1994 for Lenin's Tomb: The Last Days of the Soviet Empire; general editor of The New Yorker magazine since 1998
Booth Tarkington, A.B. 1893 – two-time Pulitzer Prize-winning novelist for The Magnificent Ambersons and Alice AdamsWilliam W. Warner, 1943 – science writer, Pulitzer Prize for general non-fiction in 1977 for Beautiful Swimmers: Watermen, Crabs, and the Chesapeake BayThornton Wilder M.A. 1925 – three-time Pulitzer Prize-winner, once for fiction and twice for drama; National Book Award winner; Our Town premiered at Princeton
George F. Will, Ph.D. 1968 – Pulitzer Prize for Commentary in 1977
Jesse Lynch Williams, A.B. 1892 –  Pulitzer Prize for drama in 1918

Journalism
Joel Achenbach, A.B. 1982 – writer for The Washington Post and author of the Post's AchenblogR. W. Apple, Jr., A.B. 1957 – writer for The New York TimesHamilton Fish Armstrong, A.B. 1914 – editor of Foreign PolicyWilliam Attwood, A.B. 1941 – U.S. Ambassador and publisher of NewsdayKate Betts, A.B. 1986 – editor-in-chief of Harper's BazaarJohn Brooks, A.B. 1942 –  author and staff member, The New YorkerRobert Caro, A.B. 1957 – Pulitzer Prize-winning non-fiction writer
Patrick Chovanec, A.B. 1993 – commentator on the economy of China in Western media
Lisa R. Cohen – Ferris professor of journalism, Emmy-winning television producer, author
Burton Crane, 1922 – The New York Times foreign correspondent and financial author
Bosley Crowther, A.B. 1928 – film critic at The New York TimesFrank Deford, A.B. 1962 – writer for Sports Illustrated; broadcaster on U.S. radio and television
James D. Ewing, 1938 – newspaper publisher, government reform advocate and philanthropist
Marc Fisher – writer for The Washington PostF. Scott Fitzgerald, A.B. 1917 – novelist and short story author
 Justin Fox (born 1964) - financial journalist, commentator, and writer
Barton Gellman, A.B. 1982 – editor at The Washington Post and Pulitzer Prize winner
Charlie Gibson, A.B. 1965 – journalist, former Good Morning America host, anchor of  ABC World News Tonight Robert Hilferty, A.B. 1982 – writer for Bloomberg News, New York, The New York Times, Opera News, and The Village VoiceJulia Ioffe (2005) - Russian-born American journalist
Olivier Kamanda, B.S.E 2003 – editor, Foreign Policy DigestDonald Kirk, A.B. 1959 – national correspondent, Chicago TribuneRichard Kluger, A.B. 1956 – Pulitzer Prize-winning author, journalist and book publisher
John B. Oakes, A.B. 1934 – editorial page editor, The New York TimesDon Oberdorfer, A.B. 1952 – writer for The Washington Post, current professor at Johns Hopkins University
Alexis Okeowo, 2006 – staff writer at The New YorkerNorimitsu Onishi, A.B. 1992 – reporter for The New York TimesRamesh Ponnuru, A.B. 1995 - editor of National ReviewPaul Raushenbush, F. 2003–2011 – Editor of Huffington Post ReligionT.R. Reid, A.B. 1966 – former correspondent, The Washington Post; bestselling non-fiction author
Maria Ressa, A.B. – 2021 Nobel Peace Prize laureate, Rappler CEO, included in the Times Person of the Year 2018
James Ridgeway, A.B. 1959 – editor and writer, New Republic and The Village VoiceRick Stengel, A.B. 1977 – managing editor of TimeJohn Stossel, A.B. 1969 – ABC News anchor/correspondent
Annalyn Swan, A.B. 1973 – co-author of 2005 Pulitzer Prize-winning De Kooning: An American MasterKatrina vanden Heuvel, A.B. 1981 – editor of The NationChristine Whelan, A.B. 1999 – contributor to The Wall Street Journal and others, author of Why Smart Men Marry Smart WomenAlexander Wolff, A.B. 1979 – writer for Sports IllustratedRobert Sterling Yard, B.A. 1883 – journalist for the New York Sun and New York Herald; editor-in-chief of The Century Magazine; founder and first president of The Wilderness Society

Sports
Kwesi Adofo-Mensah - General Manager for the Minnesota Vikings
Bella Alarie, A.B. 2020 – starting professional basketball career in 2020 with the WNBA's Dallas Wings
Hobey Baker, A.B. 1914 – ice hockey player; college hockey's top individual award is named in his memory
Carl Barisich – former professional football player, Cleveland Browns and Miami Dolphins
Danny Barnes – professional baseball pitcher
Darius Bazley(Basketball) Oklahoma City Thunder
 Amir Bell (born 1996) – basketball player in the Israel Basketball Premier League
Moe Berg, A.B. 1923 – professional baseball player and spy
David Blatt, A.B. 1981 – Israeli-American basketball player and coach (most recently, for the Cleveland Cavaliers)
Arthur Bluethenthal, 1913 – All-American football player; decorated World War I pilot
Bill Bradley, A.B. 1965 – former basketball star; member of the Basketball Hall of Fame; former U.S. Senator
Bob Bradley, A.B. 1980 – US National Soccer Coach and MLS Cup-winning coach
Andrew Calof – ice hockey player
Devin Cannady - professional basketball player with the South Bay Lakers
Karl Chandler – former professional football player, New York Giants and Detroit Lions
Mike Chernoff – Cleveland Indians general manager
Geep Chryst – quarterbacks coach, San Francisco 49ers
Mike Condon – Professional hockey goaltender with the Ottawa Senators
Jon Dekker – professional football player, Pittsburgh Steelers
Emerson Dickman – baseball coach (1949–51); his teams won two Eastern League championships and tied one, as the 1951 team reached the College World Series
Pablo Eisenberg (born 1932) - scholar, social justice advocate, and tennis player
Keith Elias, A.B. 1993 – former professional football player in the National Football League
Jonathan Erlichman, A.B. 2012 — Process and Analytics Coach, Tampa Bay Rays; first analytics coach in the history of Major League Baseball
John Fisher, A.B. 1983 – owner, Oakland Athletics
Jason Garrett – former professional football player, offensive coordinator, interim head coach, head coach (2011 –  ) for the Dallas Cowboys
Charlie Gogolak – former professional football player, Washington Redskins and New England Patriots
Wycliffe Grousbeck, A.B. 1983 – CEO, governor, and co-owner, Boston Celtics
Jeff Halpern, A.B. 1999 – current NHL player; plays for the NHL team Los Angeles Kings
Tora Harris – Princeton engineer undergraduate 2002, Olympic high jumper
Sara Hendershot, A.B. 2010 – rower at the 2012 Summer Olympics
Armond Hill – assistant coach, Los Angeles Clippers; former NBA basketball player, 1976 to 1984
Red Howard – football player 
Ariel Hsing – Olympic table tennis player
Lynn Jennings, A.B. 1983 – Olympic runner, three-time world cross country champion, member of National Distance Running Hall of Fame
Dick Kazmaier, A.B. 1952 – Heisman Trophy winner 1952
Zak Keasey – former professional football player, San Francisco 49ers
Chloe Kim – Olympic snowboarder
Andrea Leand – tennis player
Donold Lourie, A.B. 1922 – College Football Hall of Fame inductee
Larry Lucchino, A.B. 1967 – president and CEO of the Boston Red Sox
Tyler Lussi, A.B. 2017 – professional soccer player, winner of the 2017 NWSL championship with Portland Thorns FC
Jesse Marsch, A.B. 1995 – professional soccer player, winner of three MLS championships with D.C. United and the Chicago Fire
Rich McKay, A.B. 1981 – president and general manager, Atlanta Falcons
Frank McPhee – football player
Steve Mills (sports executive) – president of the New York Knicks
Steve Meister – tennis player
John Messuri – former professional hockey player, Princeton Tigers all-time leading scorer
Meredith Michaels-Beerbaum – American-born German showjumper
Edwin Mortimer Hopkins – First ever full-time head football coach at the University of Kansas, also was a long time English professor at the school
Cook Neilson, A.B. 1967 – motorcycle racer, member of American Motorcycle Association Hall of Fame
Dennis Norman, 2001 – former professional football player, San Diego Chargers
Ross Ohlendorf – former MLB pitcher for the Washington Nationals
George Parros – professional ice hockey player, for the 2007 Stanley Cup champion Anaheim Ducks
Geoff Petrie, A.B. 1970 – former NBA player; current president of basketball operations for the Sacramento Kings
Crista Samaras, A.B. 1999 – former lacrosse player and coach
Mark Shapiro – Toronto Blue Jays general manager; two-time MLB Executive of the Year
Brian Taylor – former ABA and NBA basketball player, 1972–1982
John Thompson III, 1988 – basketball coach at Georgetown
Soren Thompson, 2005 – fencer, NCAA épée champion, junior olympic champion, Maccabiah Games silver medalist, 2x Olympic fencer, team world champion. 
Ross Tucker, 2000 – former professional football player, sports columnist
Bob Tufts – Major League Baseball pitcher
Terdema Ussery, A.B. 1981 – president and CEO of the NBA's Dallas Mavericks basketball team
Will Venable – outfielder for the Texas Rangers
 Spencer Weisz (born 1995) – American-Israeli basketball player for Hapoel Haifa of the Israeli Premier League
Kevin Westgarth – NHL player; plays for the NHL team Los Angeles Kings
Lauren Wilkinson (rower) – 2012 Summer Olympics silver medalist
Erica Wu – Olympic table tennis player
Chris Young – starting pitcher for the Kansas City Royals
Ben Zinn – international soccer player and academic at Georgia Tech

Entertainment

Art and architecture
 Stan Allen M.Arch. – dean of School of Architecture, Princeton University
 Merritt Bucholz – partner of Irish-based Bucholz | McEvoy Architects, and Professor of Architecture at University of Limerick
 Thomas S. Buechner – founding director of the Corning Museum of Glass; director of the Brooklyn Museum
 Donald Drew Egbert, A.B. 1924, M.Arch. 1927 – art historian and Princeton professor
 Michael Graves – architect, designer and Princeton professor
 Jodi Hauptman, A.B. 1986 – art historian and curator
 Indrani Pal-Chaudhuri, A.B. Anthropology – photographer, director and digital artist, star of Bravo's 2010 docu-series Double Exposure about her photography
 Jim Lee, A.B. Psychology 1986 – comic book artist, known for work on X-Men, Batman; a founder of Image Comics
 Bill Pierce, A.B. 1957 – freelance photographer for TimeDemetri Porphyrios, M.Arch. 1974, Ph.D. 1980 – architect and architectural theorist
 Frank Stella – artist
 William Turnbull, Jr. – architect and Fellow of the American Institute of Architects
 Margaret Rose Vendryes Ph.D. 1997 – visual artist, curator, and art historian
 Robert Venturi, A.B. 1947, M.F.A. 1950 – architect, Pritzker Prize laureate 1991
 Marion Sims Wyeth – architect of Mar-a-Lago and other mansions

Other
Thomas B. Craighead – Presbyterian minister, president of Davidson Academy and Cumberland College in Nashville, Tennessee
Collins Denny, Jr., 1921 – pro-segregationist lawyer
David W. Doyle, '49 – Central Intelligence Agency officer; author
Cate Edwards, '04 – daughter of two-time presidential candidate and 2004 Democratic Vice Presidential nominee John Edwards
John Frame, '61 – Reformed theologian
Donald B. Fullerton, 1913 – missionary and founder of the Princeton Christian Fellowship
Zelda Harris, '07 – former child actress, known for her starring role in the Spike Lee dramedy CrooklynJames Hogue – attended Princeton under the fraudulent persona of "Alexi Indris Santana", 1989–1991
 Dario Hunter, '04 – the first Muslim-born person to be ordained a rabbi
Jeffrey R. MacDonald, '65 – subject of Joe McGinnis' best seller "Fatal Vision"; Green Beret physician convicted of murdering his wife and two children at Fort Bragg
Joseph (Lyle) Menendez – convicted murderer, left Princeton in 1988 following plagiarism charges
Michelle Obama, '85 – First Lady of the United States, wife of United States President Barack Obama
Zhuo Qun Song, '19 – currently the most highly decorated International Mathematical Olympiad (IMO) contestant, with five gold medals and one bronze medal
Richard Aaker Trythall, '63 – composer and pianist, winner of the 1964 Rome Prize in Musical Composition, fellow and music liaison of the American Academy in Rome
Peter Aaron Van Dorn – lawyer, judge and planter from Mississippi
John C. Whitcomb, '48 – young earth creationist

In fictionListed in alphabetical order by title name. 24 – President Charles Logan graduated from Princeton University
 30 Rock – Jack Donaghy is an alumnus; multiple episodes center on his college experience
 Across the Universe – the character Max attends Princeton, but drops out
 Atlanta — Earnest "Earn" Marks attended Princeton University before dropping out
 Batman Begins – Bruce Wayne attended Princeton University, although he chose not to continue his education there after returning home (it is unknown whether he had completed his undergraduate school education and was attending graduate school or if he was dropping out of college)
 A Beautiful Mind – tells of the mathematician John Forbes Nash Jr.'s initial days at Princeton University (Although the film is a fictionalized biography, in real life Nash did receive his doctorate from Princeton and was a Princeton professor)
 The Big Bang Theory – Leonard Hofstadter attended Princeton, and Amy Farrah Fowler served a fellowship there until Sheldon Cooper proposed to her.
 Boardwalk Empire – James "Jimmy" Darmody attended Princeton, but dropped out to enlist in World War I, disappointing his guardian Enoch Thompson
 Burn After Reading – Osbourne Cox, the lead played by John Malkovich, was a Princeton Graduate Class of 1973, and in a scene at a fictional Princeton Club, leads a fast-tempo rendition of Princeton's anthem, Old Nassau
 The Change-Up – Dave Lockwood graduated from Princeton University
 Charles in Charge – Charles gets accepted as a graduate student in Princeton
 A Cinderella Story – the characters played by Hilary Duff and Chad Michael Murray will be attending Princeton at the end of the movie
 Commander in Chief – Kelly Ludlow, the press secretary played by Ever Carradine has graduated from Princeton
 The Cosby Show – Sondra Huxtable and her (future) husband Elvin Tibideaux of graduated from Princeton
 Cruel Intentions – Marci Greenbaum, Tara Reid's character was accepted into Princeton. Sebastian, the protagonist, manipulated her.
 Designated Survivor –  Tom Kirkman, Secretary of Housing and Urban Development turned President of the United States who was named designated survivor for the State of the Union address, and rose to the presidency after a terrorist attack killed the entire line of succession, was a Princeton alumni.
 Doogie Howser, M.D. – the namesake child prodigy graduated from Princeton at the age of 10 in 1983 and received his medical license at age 14
 Everwood – Amy Abbott is accepted to Princeton
 Family Ties – "Young Republican" Alex P. Keaton (Michael J. Fox) spends the first two seasons of the series preparing to attend Princeton
 The Flintstones – in the 1961 episode entitled "Flintstone of Prinstone", Fred briefly attends Princeton's prehistoric counterpart, "Prinstone University", as a part-time student;  in the 1964 episode "Cinderellastone", Fred's dream character also attended Prinstone
 The Fresh Prince of Bel-Air – Princeton is Philip's alma mater; his son, Carlton, enrolls in Princeton by the final episode
 Gilmore Girls – Rory Gilmore is accepted into Princeton University
 The Girl Next Door – Eli is mentioned as having been accepted to Princeton
 Good in Bed, novel by Jennifer Weiner – protagonist Cannie Shapiro is a Princeton alumna
 In Her Shoes (1991), a novel by Jennifer Weiner – Rose Feller is a Princeton grad. Her younger sister Maggie camps out in a Princeton library
 Leatherheads – the character of Carter Rutherford is a star Princeton quarterback
 Left Behind series – character Cameron "Buck" Williams is a Princeton grad
 Lord Kalvan of Otherwhen, science fiction novel by H. Beam Piper – Calvin Morrison had been a theology student at Princeton, but dropped out to join the U.S. Army and fight in the Korean War; He later becomes an officer with the Pennsylvania State Police and transported to another time-line
 Mad Men – Paul Kinsey is a Princeton graduate (class of '55) and in "My Old Kentucky Home" (season 3, episode 3), Kinsey's classmate Jeffrey, a drug dealer, reminisces about the Tigertones a cappella group
 Mars Attacks! – President James Dale (Jack Nicholson) is a Princeton alumnus
 The Mindy Project – the main character, Mindy Lahiri, attended Princeton
 Numb3rs – the characters of Charlie Eppes and Larry Fleinhardt are Princeton Alumni (Charlie graduated at the age of 16 and Larry at the age of 19)
 The Princess Diaries 2: Royal Engagement – Anne Hathaway's character has graduated from Princeton
 The Reluctant Fundamentalist, novel – the characters Changez and Erica are Princeton grads
 Risky Business – Tom Cruise's character gets into Princeton after an unconventional interview at his own home
 Rubber – one of the spectators ("film buff Ethan") appears wearing an orange-embroidered black baseball cap reading "PRINCETO"
 The Rule of Four, mystery novel – the protagonists are Princeton students and the Art Museum and its collections play a central role in the plot
 Salt – Angelina Jolie's character Evelyn Salt went to Princeton
 The Simpsons – Cecil Terwilliger, the brother of Sideshow Bob, is an alumnus (Sideshow Bob refers to it as the years Cecil spent in Clown College); Snake also attended, but took a year off, presumably never to return
 South Pacific – Lt. Joe Cable attended Princeton
 South Park – Mayor McDaniels
 The Sun Also Rises – Robert Cohn is a Princeton graduate
 The Talented Mr. Ripley – Dickie Greenleaf (played by Jude Law) has attended Princeton, and the title character Tom Ripley pretends he is a Princeton alumnus.
 There's Something About Mary – Mary attended Princeton University, as did her ex-boyfriend "Woogie" who was also holder of a scholarship from Princeton
 Thirtysomething – Hope Murdoch Steadman, portrayed by Mel Harris, graduated from Princeton
 This Side of Paradise, semi-autobiographical novel by F. Scott Fitzgerald – a Princeton alumnus himself, the protagonist Amory Blaine attends PrincetonFrom the book, "Amory had decided definitely on Princeton, even though he would be the only boy entering that year from St. Regis'."
 The War of the Worlds, 1938 radio adaptation Professor Richard Pierson of the Princeton Observatory, portrayed by Orson Welles
 Watchmen, a graphic novel created by writer Alan Moore, artist Dave Gibbons, and colorist John Higgins  –   Dr. Jon Osterman/Doctor Manhattan, born 1929, attended Princeton University in 1948–1958 and graduated with a Ph.D. in atomic physics
 Weeds – the character Megan gets accepted into Princeton
 The West Wing – former Deputy Communications Director Sam Seaborn (Rob Lowe) is a magna cum laude'' Princeton graduate

See also
 History of Princeton University
 List of Nobel laureates affiliated with Princeton University as alumni or faculty

References

External links
 Official website of Princeton University

People